Kurkinsky District  is an administrative district (raion), one of the twenty-three in Tula Oblast, Russia. As a municipal division, it is incorporated as Kurkinsky Municipal District. It is located in the southeast of the oblast. Its administrative center is the urban locality (a work settlement) of Kurkino. Population: 10,830 (2010 Census);  The population of Kurkino accounts for 50.0% of the district's total population.

References

Notes

Sources

Districts of Tula Oblast